Harry Luther Haines (February 1, 1880 in Red Lion, Pennsylvania – March 29, 1947) was a Democratic member of the U.S. House of Representatives from Pennsylvania.

Biography
Haines attended the State Normal School at Lock Haven, Pennsylvania, and Patrick's Business College at York, Pennsylvania. He was engaged in the manufacture and brokerage of cigars from 1906 to 1934.  He was a burgess of Red Lion from 1921 to 1930, and a delegate to the Democratic State Convention in 1918.

Haines was elected as a Democrat to the Seventy-second and to the three succeeding Congresses. He was an unsuccessful candidate for reelection in 1938. He served in the office of the Pennsylvania State Treasurer in 1939 and 1940.

He was again elected in 1940 to the Seventy-seventh Congress, but was an unsuccessful candidate for reelection in 1942.

After his time in Congress, he briefly worked as editor of the plant magazine of the York Safe & Lock Co. from 1943 to 1944.

External links

The Political Graveyard

1880 births
1947 deaths
People from Red Lion, Pennsylvania
Lock Haven University of Pennsylvania alumni
Democratic Party members of the United States House of Representatives from Pennsylvania
20th-century American politicians